Garra duobarbis is a species of cyprinid fish in the genus Garra. It is endemic to Ethiopia.

References 

Garra
Endemic fauna of Ethiopia
Fish of Ethiopia
Fish described in 2007
Cyprinid fish of Africa